Ritzy is a lost 1927 American comedy silent film directed by Richard Rosson and written by Elinor Glyn, Percy Heath, Robert N. Lee and George Marion, Jr. The film stars Betty Bronson, James Hall, William Austin, Joan Standing, George Nichols and Roscoe Karns. The film was released on April 9, 1927, by Paramount Pictures.

Cast  
Betty Bronson as Ritzy Brown
James Hall as Harrington Smith, Duke of Westborough
William Austin as Algy
Joan Standing as Mary
George Nichols as Nathan Brown
Roscoe Karns as Smith's Valet

References

External links 
 
 

1927 films
1920s English-language films
Silent American comedy films
1927 comedy films
Paramount Pictures films
American black-and-white films
Lost American films
American silent feature films
1927 lost films
Lost comedy films
Films directed by Richard Rosson
1920s American films
English-language comedy films